Motya abseuzalis is a species of nolid moth in the family Nolidae. It is found in North America.

The MONA or Hodges number for Motya abseuzalis is 8981.

References

Further reading

 
 
 

Nolidae
Articles created by Qbugbot
Moths described in 1859